The 1973–74 Yorkshire Football League was the 48th season in the history of the Yorkshire Football League, a football competition in England.

Division One

Division One featured 12 clubs which competed in the previous season, along with four new clubs, promoted from Division Two:
Hatfield Main
Leeds & Carnegie College
Woolley Miners Welfare
Worsbrough Bridge Miners Welfare Athletic

League table

Map

Division Two

Division Two featured nine clubs which competed in the previous season, along with seven new clubs.
Clubs relegated from Division One:
Bridlington Town
Brook Sports
North Ferriby United
Selby Town
Clubs promoted from Division Three:
Hall Road Rangers
Liversedge
Ossett Town

League table

Map

Division Three

Division Three featured ten clubs which competed in the previous season, along with six new clubs.
Clubs relegated from Division Two:
Stocksbridge Works
Thorne Colliery
Plus:
Bentley Victoria Welfare, joined from the Doncaster & District Senior League
Maltby Miners Welfare, joined from the Sheffield Association League
Redfearn National Glass
Tadcaster Albion

League table

Map

League Cup

Final

References

1973–74 in English football leagues
Yorkshire Football League